3-Mercaptopyruvic acid is an intermediate in cysteine metabolism.  It has been studied as a potential treatment for cyanide poisoning, but its half-life is too short for it to be clinically effective.  Instead, prodrugs, such as sulfanegen, are being evaluated to compensate for the short half-life of 3-mercaptopyruvic acid.

See also
 3-mercaptopyruvate sulfurtransferase

References

Carboxylic acids
Thiols
Alpha-keto acids